GURPS Rogues is a sourcebook for GURPS, by Lynette Cowper.

Contents
Rogues is a template book, one of the last of the Third Edition products. It has a collection of shady characters including Sam Hill, a Willful Skeleton the player characters might run into poking around in the Old or Not-So-Old West.

Publication history

Reception

References

Rogues
Role-playing game supplements introduced in 2003